Welch Mountains is a group of Antarctic mountains that dominate the area, the highest peak rising to 3,015 m, located 25 nautical miles (46 km) north of Mount Jackson on the east margin of the Dyer Plateau of Palmer Land. These mountains were probably seen from the air by Ellsworth in 1935 and their north extremities were sketched in 1936 by a British Graham Land Expedition (BGLE) sledge party under Rymill. In 1940 they were photographed from the air and charted from the ground by the United States Antarctic Service (USAS), and in the expedition reports and charts were assumed to be Ellsworth's Eternity Range. The mountains were mapped in detail by United States Geological Survey (USGS) in 1974. Named by Advisory Committee on Antarctic Names (US-ACAN) for Rear Admiral David F. Welch, Commander, U.S. Naval Support Force, Antarctica, 1969–71.

See also
Mount Schimansky

References 

Mountain ranges of Palmer Land